Hallevannet is a lake in the municipality of Larvik in Vestfold og Telemark county, Norway.

See also
List of lakes in Norway

Lakes of Vestfold og Telemark